Singkham Phongpratith (born 10 October 1950) is a Laotian boxer. He competed in the men's light flyweight event at the 1980 Summer Olympics. At the 1980 Summer Olympics, he lost to Pedro Nieves of Venezuela.

References

External links
 

1950 births
Living people
Laotian male boxers
Olympic boxers of Laos
Boxers at the 1980 Summer Olympics
Place of birth missing (living people)
Light-flyweight boxers